The 43rd Blue Dragon Film Awards ceremony was held on November 25, 2022, at KBS Hall in Yeouido, Seoul. Organized by Sports Chosun (a sister brand of Chosun Ilbo). It aired live on KBS2. 18 categories were awarded at the 43rd edition of awards ceremony, hosted by Kim Hye-soo (29th time) and Yoo Yeon-seok (5th time). The nominations for 15 categories were announced for the Korean films released from October 15, 2021 to October 30, 2022 on November 8, 2022, Decision to Leave got 13 nominations in 13 categories, and won 7 awards including Best Film, Best Director, Best Actor, Best Actress, Best Screenplay, Best Music, and Popular Star Awards.

Nominees and winners 
The nominees for the 43rd Blue Dragon Film Awards were announced on November 8, 2022.

Winners are listed first, highlighted in boldface, and indicated with a double dagger.

Films that received multiple nominations 
The following films received multiple nominations:

Presenters

Performances

See also 
 58th Baeksang Arts Awards
 58th Grand Bell Awards
 31st Buil Film Awards
 27th Chunsa Film Art Awards

References

External links 
  

Blue Dragon Film Awards
Blue Dragon Film Awards
Blue Dragon Film Awards
Blue Dragon Film Awards